Ridgeway is an unincorporated community in Harris County, in the U.S. state of Georgia.

History
Ridgeway was founded ca. 1829, and named for the ridge upon which the town site rests.  A variant name was "Mount Airy". A post office called Ridgeway was established in 1888, and remained in operation until 1903.

References

Unincorporated communities in Harris County, Georgia